University of Psychogenic Fugue, sometimes abbreviated to UPF, is a satirical humor book in the form of a parody college course catalog for a fictional American University written by Tye R Farrell and Jeffrey Morrow. It was published by Meteorite Press in 2002. Its subtitle is A Course Catalog for Students of Life.

The book satirizes the 21st century college experience and the foibles of modern life through hundreds of "classes" in 15 "departments" of study, including Glamour, Suburban Science, Life Science, and Love. In addition, the book describes fictional scholarships, grants, university buildings, and meaninglessly complex policies. There are numerous campus clubs, fraternities and sororities, including Gamma Lambda Ding Dong and Eradicate Ugliness Worldwide. The book's sometimes cynical humor has been described as similar to The Onion.

The University's name comes from a psychological condition, psychogenic fugue, in which a person is unable to remember his or her past. The term psychogenic fugue was re-categorized as dissociative fugue so now (according to the authors) it is a state of mind that doesn't exist. This attitude reflects many of the mock course offerings you're not likely to encounter in traditional higher education, including:

 Glamour 106: Build a Better Supermodel
 Business 112: Advanced Drug Dealing
 Life Science 599: Postmodern Coffee
 Love 214: Valentine's Day Sabotage
 Suburban Science 244: How to be a Carnie
 Culinary Arts 105: Living Without Food
 Generally Accepted Science 131: Cadaver Farming
 Ethics 102: Living a Lie II
 Communications 121: Calling in Sick

The book received a number of humor and culture awards. Its format has drawn attention from diverse sources, from the Chronicle of Higher Education to counterculture magazine High Times, as well as college and internet press.

UPF also hosts an online satirical counterpart where web surfers can learn more about the University and its programs of study.

References
 The New University of Popular Culture: Psychogenic Fugue Rips Academia
 Life 101: taking tips from imaginary college
 High Times - Odds and Ends

2002 books
Satirical books
Parody novels
American comedy websites
Black comedy books